Redshirt, in United States college athletics, is a delay or suspension of an athlete's participation in order to lengthen their period of eligibility. Typically, a student's athletic eligibility in a given sport is four seasons, aligning with the four years of academic classes typically required to earn a bachelor's degree at an American college or university. However, in a redshirt year, student athletes may attend classes at the college or university, practice with an athletic team, and "suit up" (wear a team uniform) for play – but they may compete in only a limited number of games (see "Use of status" section). Using this mechanism, a student athlete has at most five academic years to use the four years of eligibility, thus becoming what is termed a fifth-year senior.

Etymology and origin
According to Merriam-Webster and Webster's Third New International Dictionary, Unabridged, the term redshirt comes from the red jersey commonly worn by such a player in practice scrimmages against the regulars.

The origin of the term redshirt was likely from Warren Alfson of the University of Nebraska who, in 1937, asked to practice but not play and wore a Nebraska red shirt without a number. The term is used as a verb, noun, and adjective. For example, a coach may choose to redshirt an athlete who is then referred to as a redshirt, and a redshirt freshman refers to an athlete in the first year of participation, after a redshirt non-participatory year.

Rationale

Student athletes just out of high school may not be ready for the  academic and athletic demands at the university level. Redshirting provides the opportunity, with tutoring, to take  classes for an academic year and become accustomed to the academic and physical rigors of university athletics. They may also redshirt to undergo a year of practice with a team prior to participating in competition. In American college football, a student athlete may redshirt to work towards increasing physical size, strength, and stamina during their final phases of physical maturation. Athletes may also redshirt to learn the team playbook, as many college teams run more complex formations and executions than high school teams.

Athletes may be asked to redshirt if they would have little or no opportunity to compete as an academic freshman, which is a common occurrence in team sports where there is already an established upperclassman, and/or too much depth at a particular position. Redshirting allows the coaching staff the flexibility to use the athlete in competition for a full four years instead of just three years.

Terminology
The term redshirt freshman indicates an academic sophomore who is in their first season of athletic participation. A redshirt freshman is distinguished from a true freshman: a student who is in their first year both academically and athletically. A redshirt freshman may have practiced during the prior season. The term redshirt sophomore is also commonly used to indicate an academic junior who is in the second season of athletic participation. After the second athletic year, the term redshirt is rarely used; the terms fourth-year junior and fifth-year senior are used instead. Students who have been in college for more than four years or are graduate students may collectively be referred to as super seniors.

Use of status 
While the redshirt status may be conferred by a coach at the beginning of the year, it is not confirmed until the end of the season, and more specifically, it does not rule an athlete ineligible in advance to participate in the season. If an athlete shows great talent, or there are injuries on the team, the coach may remove the redshirt status and allow the athlete to participate in competition for the remainder of the year.

The first athlete known to extend his eligibility in the modern era of redshirting was Warren Alfson of the University of Nebraska in 1937. Alfson requested that he be allowed to sit out his sophomore season due to the number of experienced players ahead of him. In addition, he had not started college until several years after graduating from high school, and thus felt he needed more preparation. The year off greatly benefited him; Alfson was All-Big Six Conference in 1939 and an All-American guard in 1940.

In the NJCAA system, use of redshirt may be pointless, as most students graduate in two years. But, the NCAA counts eligibility against any collegiate sports involvement. This means competition in different leagues, such as the NJCAA, NCCAA, NAIA, NCAA, etc will count against one another.

In January 2017, the trade association for college football coaches, the American Football Coaches Association, proposed a change to that sport's eligibility rules that maintains the current model of four years of play in five years, but significantly changes the redshirt rule. Under the proposal, medical redshirts would be eliminated, but redshirt status would not be lost unless a player participated in more than four games in a season. The proposal, which was unanimously passed by the AFCA subcommittees for all three NCAA divisions, was approved by the NCAA Division I Council in June 2018, taking effect with the 2018 college football season. The original proposal was to have been retroactive, meaning that players with athletic eligibility remaining who had played in four or fewer games in a given season would have effectively received one extra season of eligibility, but the final passed proposal was not retroactive.

Generally, eligibility must be used up within 6 years of enrolling at an eligible NCAA institution. Redshirts and medical redshirt eligibility deferrals cannot go beyond this 6 year period. Although this rule does not apply to other collegiate sports organizations, like the NAIA where nontraditional students are allowed to compete. In the NCAA, use of various eligibility deferral techniques can lead to situations wherein an athlete has been an athlete for much longer than four years. Because the NCAA gave a free season of eligibility to student-athletes affected by disruptions brought on by COVID-19, this led to many athletes competing in a 7th season in 2021-2022. One example is Summer Allen of Weber State, whose competitive college career spanned 9 seasons. She competed in both the 2013 and 2021 NCAA Women's Division I Cross Country Championship. Her eligibility was extended by going on an 18-month LDS Church mission that spanned 2 years of eligibility, redshirting 1 year, having a pregnancy 1 year, and losing a season due to COVID.

As of the 2022–23 school year, NCAA Division II still follows the redshirt rules used in D-I before 2018. The Division II Presidents Council voted in October 2022 to support a proposed change in redshirt rules for football, which would allow players in that sport in their first year of college attendance to play up to three games without losing a year of eligibility. If approved by the D-II football membership at the 2023 NCAA Convention, this change will take effect with the 2023 season.

Other colors
A special case involves the eligibility of an athlete who loses the majority of a season to injury, popularly known as a medical redshirt. A hardship waiver may be granted to those athletes who sustain a major injury while appearing in less than 30% of competitions and have not participated after the midpoint of a season. For the purposes of eligibility, athletes granted such a waiver are treated as though they did not compete in that season.

In 2016, a new status could be applied to prospective student athletes, dubbed an academic redshirt. That year, the NCAA started enforcing new, stricter admissions requirements for incoming athletic freshmen. Under these new requirements, a student athlete who meets a school's own academic admission requirements but does not meet the NCAA requirement of a 2.3 GPA across four years, may enter school as an academic redshirt. This student can receive an athletic scholarship and practice with the team, but may not participate in competition. An academic redshirt does not lose a year of eligibility, and may later take an injury redshirt if needed. Finally, as long as an academic redshirt completes nine academic credit hours in their first semester they may then compete in their second year free of restrictions.

An athlete may also use a "grayshirt" year, in which the athlete attends school as neither a full-time student nor the recipient of a scholarship. The athlete is an unofficial member of the team and does not participate in practices, games, or receive financial assistance from the athletic department. One example is an athlete who is injured right before college and requires an entire year to recuperate. Rather than waste the redshirt, the athlete can attend school as a part-time student and join the team later. This is also used by athletes with religious obligations, serving in the military, or completing missionary work that keep them out of school for a season. Any eligibility lost during this time is deferred to future seasons. This is commonly used by adherents of the Church of Jesus Christ of Latter-day Saints; the church's young men are strongly encouraged to go on 2-year missions, and young women are allowed but not expected to serve as such for 18 months.

"Blueshirt" athletes are those that the NCAA does not classify as a "recruited student-athlete". They have never made an official visit to the school, met with the school's athletic employees, had more than one phone call with them, or received a scholarship offer. These athletes are walk-ons, but can receive scholarships after enrolling; although they are immediately eligible to compete, their scholarships count for the school's quota in the following year. The New Mexico State Aggies football program was the first to blueshirt in the early 2000s; other football programs include Oklahoma State.

A pinkshirt refers to a female athlete who misses a season due to pregnancy. The pinkshirt is only applicable if they do not compete during that season. Eligibility is deferred to the next year.

See also
Postgraduate year
Reclassification (education), repeating a year in middle school or high school to grow physically and academically

References

External links
 NCAA Frequently-Asked Questions on Redshirts, Age Limits, and Graduate Participation. Note: site requires account to access
 Redshirt Freshman
 Findlaw.com definition of Redshirt

College sports in the United States
Sports terminology